(born 15 April 1998) is a Japanese professional golfer. She plays on the LPGA of Japan Tour where she has eight victories.

Career
Koiwai was born in Kitahiroshima, Hokkaido in 1998 and started playing golf when she was 8 years old. She won the Hokkaido Amateur Championship in 2014 and 2016.

Koiwai turned professional and joined the LPGA of Japan Tour in 2017. In 2018, she recorded four runner-up finishes to rank 8th on the money list, and won the PGA Rookie of the Year award and the Japan Professional Sports Rookie of the Year award.

She captured the 2019 Samantha Thavasa Girls Collection Ladies Tournament for her maiden win on the JLPGA. Her lone victory in 2020 was the Golf5 Ladies.

In 2021, Koiwai recorded four wins and three second-place finishes, to finish 3rd on the 2020–21 money list with over 200 million yen in season earnings.

In mid-2021, she rose into the top-50 in the Women's World Golf Rankings for the first time.

Amateur wins
2014 Hokkaido Amateur Championship
2016 Hokkaido Amateur Championship

Source:

Professional wins

LPGA of Japan Tour wins (8)

^Tournament shortened due to adverse conditions.

References

External links
 
 

Japanese female golfers
LPGA of Japan Tour golfers
Sportspeople from Hokkaido
1998 births
Living people
21st-century Japanese women